Alexander Robert Johnston, FRS (formerly Campbell-Johnston, 14 June 1812 – 21 January 1888) was a British colonial official who served twice as Acting Administrator of Hong Kong from 1841 to 1842. He also served in the Executive and Legislative Councils of Hong Kong. He became a Fellow of the Royal Society in 1845 for his work on the natural history of China.

Early life 
Johnston was born on 14 June 1812 in Colombo, Ceylon, as the third son of Sir Alexander Johnston, who was Chief Justice of Ceylon. He began his career in the Colonial Office as a writer in Mauritius in 1828, and shortly after became a clerk in the Colonial Secretary's department. He remained in the Mauritius civil service until 1833, when he returned to England after economic conditions in the colony forced him to leave his post.

China 

In 1833, Johnston became Private Secretary to his cousin Lord Napier, who was sent to Canton as Chief Superintendent of Trade after the abolition of the East India Company's monopoly of the China Trade. After Napier died in October 1834, he was replaced by John Francis Davis, and Johnston became Secretary and Treasurer of the Commission. After Davis' retirement in January 1835, Johnston became Third Superintendent of Trade. In November 1836, he was promoted to Second Superintendent. In 1837, after the Commission abolished the offices of Second and Third Superintendent, he became Deputy Superintendent of Trade under Captain Charles Elliot, who was both Chief Superintendent and Plenipotentiary.

During the First Opium War, he served on board the steamship Nemesis in the expedition up the Broadway River from Macao to Canton on 13–15 March 1841. On 22 June, when Elliot prepared to join the British expeditionary force in the north during the war, he appointed Johnston as acting Administrator of Hong Kong. On 10 August, Sir Henry Pottinger arrived in China to replace Elliot as plenipotentiary. Pottinger, who arrived in Hong Kong on 22 August while on his way to the expedition, kept Johnston as acting administrator. Acting on Elliot's policy of encouraging a growing settlement, Johnston disposed land lots for development, which he classified into marine, town, and suburban. In November 1841, he sent Pottinger an account of the settlement's progress, such as the development of Queen's Road, the Magistracy, the Record Office, and a prison. Barracks were built in Stanley and a bridle path was laid towards Aberdeen. He reported that houses were being built and that many people were making applications for land. However, Pottinger criticised Johnston for granting land without elaboration of Hong Kong's future from the British government. He returned to Hong Kong on 1 February 1842. Historian Frank Welsh wrote, "He got few thanks for it, then or later, but it is largely due to Johnston's initiative that Hong Kong was allowed to develop".

When Pottinger left Hong Kong on 13 June to rejoin the expedition, Johnston was again left in charge and was told not to grant land except for barracks and the troops' families who began to arrive from Britain. In October 1842, he informed Pottinger of the crime and disorder in the colony. Piracy was frequent and isolated houses were attacked, often by gangs who landed from boats. The jail was full, but Johnston said he lacked the authority to impose sentences on the inmates awaiting trial. Such conditions helped the Colonial Office be aware of the importance of establishing full control of law and order, and the danger of allowing the Chinese to share this responsibility. On 2 December, Pottinger returned from the north, and Johnston remained Deputy Superintendent of Trade, which was changed in 1843 to the Assistant and Registrar to the Superintendent of Trade. After Pottinger became the first Governor of Hong Kong on 26 June 1843, he appointed Johnston as a member of the Executive and Legislative Councils on 21 August.

Johnston returned to England on sick leave in October 1843. He received a medal for his services on board the Nemesis during the war. He was elected a Fellow of the Royal Society on 5 June 1845 for his contributions to the natural history of China. He returned to Hong Kong in September 1845 as Secretary and Registrar to the Superintendent of Trade. In June 1846, Johnston was made a member of the Executive Council in place of Colonial Secretary Frederick Wright-Bruce who went on leave before being appointed Lieutenant-Governor of Newfoundland. After the abolition of the office of Secretary and Registrar on 25 September 1852, he obtained a compensation allowance, and retired to England in March 1853.

Later life 

On 30 September 1856, Johnston married Frances Ellen Palliser at St George's, Hanover Square, London. They had eight sons and two daughters, including Conway Campbell-Johnston (1859–1915), who died with his wife in the sinking of the Lusitania, and Malcolm Campbell-Johnston, who was Conservative Member of Parliament for East Ham South. Johnston resided in Suffolk, where he was a justice of the peace, and in London.

In 1883, Johnston and his wife travelled to the United States, where they visited the small town of Garvanza, California. They returned to England while their sons operated the ranch and then visited again in 1888. The ranch was used for cattle grazing and many buildings were constructed. Johnston died there on 21 January 1888.

His widow accompanied his remains back to England, being buried in Brompton Cemetery, London. She hired Arthur Edmund Street (son of architect George Edmund Street) to design the Church of the Angels as a memorial. Street's design was based on Holmbury St Mary's Church in Surrey and later modified by architect Ernest Coxhead in Los Angeles. Built in 1889, it became a registered historic landmark in Pasadena. It is the most prominent remaining structure from the Campbell-Johnston Ranch.

Namesakes 
Johnston House, present-day known as the Former French Mission Building, 1, Battery Path, Central, Hong Kong
Johnston Road, Wan Chai, Hong Kong
Mount Johnston, Ap Lei Chau, Hong Kong
Johnston Lake, Pasadena, California, United States

Notes 
Footnotes

Citations

References 
The Chinese Repository. Volume 11. Canton. 1842.
Endacott, G. B. (2005) [1962]. A Biographical Sketch-book of Early Hong Kong. Hong Kong University Press. .
Wordie, Jason (2002). Streets: Exploring Hong Kong Island. Hong Kong University Press. .

External links 
Records of Johnston at The National Archives

1812 births
1888 deaths
19th-century British politicians
19th-century Hong Kong people
British people of the First Opium War
Campbell-Johnston
Governors of Hong Kong
Members of the Executive Council of Hong Kong
Members of the Legislative Council of Hong Kong
People from Colombo
People from British Ceylon
Sri Lankan people of British descent